Old Fire Station may refer to:
OFS Studio in Oxford, also known as the Old Fire Station, England, United Kingdom
Old Fire Station, Kennington, a Grade II listed building, England, United Kingdom
Old Fire Station (Chester, Illinois), listed on the National Register of Historic Places, United States